There are 81 dams in Kerala. Of the 81 dams, the Kerala State Electricity Board owns 59 dams which form 45 reservoirs, the Kerala Irrigation Department owns 20 dams which form 20 reservoirs and the Kerala Water Authority vests the control of 2 dams with 2 reservoirs. Three dams - Munnar Headworks Dam, Lower Periyar Dam, and Maniyar Dam - have no drainage area across the river.

The Idukki Dam and Idamalayar Dams hold 48 percent of the total storage capacity combined of all dams in Kerala. There are multiple dams in 3 reservoirs - Gavi Dam, Kakki Dam, and Idukki Dam. In addition, there are 10 large barrages also in the state. Out of the 81 dams 37 reservoirs are used for hydroelectric power, 27 reservoirs are used for irrigation and 9 reservoirs are used for both hydroelectric power and irrigation.

References 

 

Dams

Dams
Kerala